Duo Gelland is a Swedish-German violin duo on the international classical scene. The members are Cecilia and Martin Gelland. The duo was founded in 1994.

Life 
Their early recordings of Cantus gemellus by Dieter Acker and the fiercely demanding one-hour-long cycle for two violins (1951) by Allan Pettersson showed the true potentials of the violin duo, inspiring many composers to turn to this medium. Duo Gelland received over 200 dedications, among them duos by: Giorgio Netti, Bernd Franke, Samuel Adler, Hans-Joachim Hespos, Alexander Keuk, Madeleine Isaksson, Birgitte Alsted, Kerstin Jeppsson, Maurice Karkoff, Olov Franzén, Gunnar Bucht, Carin Bartosch Edström, Rolf Martinsson, Erika Förare, Miklós Maros, Gerhard Samuel, Saman Samadi, Britta Byström, Johan Ramström, Paula af Malmborg Ward, Marie Samuelsson, Peter Schuback, Victoria Bond, Anders Hultqvist, Peter Lindroth, Max Käck, Cecilia Franke, Gunnar Valkare, Fredrik Hagstedt, Nikolaus Brass, Michael Fiday, Andreas F. Staffel, Simon Christensen, Justin Henry Rubin, Gunnar Valkare.

Duo Gelland also premiered duos by other composers – never performed due to lack of permanent violin duos – by Werner Wolf Glaser, Gunnar Berg, Hans Holewa, Erika Förare, Oleg Gotskosik, Ture Rangström. Further important duos belonging to their repertory are those by Luigi Nono, James Dillon, Olga Neuwirth, Giacinto Scelsi, Roman Haubenstock-Ramati, Jacqueline Fontyn. 

Duo Gelland's performance of Traumwerk by James Dillon was filmed by Johan Ramström. It was awarded the Jahrespreis der deutschen Schallplattenkritik 2008. Another award is the Interpreter’s Prize of the Society of Swedish Composers (FST). The inscription reads: 
They take on the new music with an overwhelming empathy and a virtually feverish intensity, catching the audience in a bubble of absolute presence.

Duo Gelland received dedications of works for violin duo and orchestra or ensemble by Harold Blumenfeld (premiered 1996), Ingvar Karkoff (premiered 2009), Alexander Keuk (premiered 2013), Olov Franzén (premiered 2014), Olof Lindgren (premiered 2002). Håkan Larsson (premiered 2002). January 2003 Duo Gelland premiered Håkan Larsson's Angesicht in Angesicht – inspired by Ingmar Bergman's films – for violin duo and orchestra in the Berliner Philharmonie. Spring 2003 two works for violin duo and choir by Hans-Erik Dahlgren and Olof Lindgren were premiered together with Dresdner Kammerchor and Hans-Christoph Rademann.
In Berliner Philharmonie 2006 together with the RIAS Kammerchor and Hans-Christoph Rademann, Duo Gelland premiered works for violin duo and choir by Sunleif Rasmussen, Peter Schuback and Håkan Larsson.

The dramatic and physical qualities of Duo Gelland's stage presence has been cultivated in cross over productions e.g. in provocatively moving The donkey on Mars, text Kasëm Trebeshina (Albania), in collaboration with choreographer Britta Hanssen and composer Birgitte Alsted. Here the synthesis of emotion, motion, word and sound is explored in a mode which could be referred to as violin theater.

Duo Gelland's growing historic repertory involves research in archives and libraries. The musicologist Ulrich Mazurowicz points out that the second half of the 18th century into the beginning of the 19th century was a period when string duos were printed more often than any other constellation including songs, operas, string quartets, music for orchestra or piano. Of all these string duos the major part was violin duos. 
Duo Gelland's continuous study of historic literature on music performance, theory and philosophy is a source of inspiration facing both their old and their new repertoire.
Characteristic for Duo Gelland's work with new music is the close collaboration with composers and the search for an individual world of sounds for each new composition approached.
As artists in residence 2002 – 2011 in the municipality of Strömsund, Jämtland, northern Sweden, Duo Gelland developed their interactive and mutually artistically stimulating work with children and teens referred to as The Strömsund method.

The teachers of the violinists were Max Rostal, Walter Levin and each one of the other members of the LaSalle Quartet, Ricardo Odnoposoff, Gerhart Hetzel, Kurt Sassmannshaus, Ingeborg Scheerer, Josef Grünfarb, Machie Oguri-Kudo and for shorter periods Valery Klimov, Wolfgang Schneiderhan, Pierre d'Archambeau, composition and Allan Sapp music theory.

Discography

Allan Pettersson, Seven Sonatas for Two Violins (1951), 58 min.
Werner Wolf Glaser, Duo (1966), 17 min.
Dieter Acker, Cantus gemellus (1973) 9 min.
Erika Förare, Duo op. 1 (1976–79), 27 min. and Duo no. 2 (2002), 12 min. 
James Dillon, Traumwerk (1995–96), 26 min.
Olof Lindgren, Jieleden Vuilie (Chant of Life) (1995) and other works (1995–2002), 67 min.
Olov Franzén, Autumn Duo (1997), 16 min.
Anders Hultqvist, Apricot trees exist (1998/2000), 9 min.
Birgitte Alsted, Zweigeigen (2001), 13 min.
Gunnar Bucht, Partita (2001), 15 min. and Tre per due (2004), 16 min.
Peter Schuback, del altro al altro (2001), 14 min.
Max Käck, Aonia terra (2001), 12 min.
Håkan Larsson, När intet blir allt (2002), 14 min.
Kerstin Jeppsson, Canto cromàtico (2002) 18 min.
Hans-Erik Dahlgren, Imagines Memoriae (2002) and other works (2002–2004), 32 min.
Rolf Martinsson, Symbiosis (2003), 19 min.
Ingvar Karkoff, Largo (2004) 7 min. and Gelland Suite (2004), 8 min.
Bernd Franke, "in between (IV)" (2007), 11 min.
Oleg Gotskosik, From the Jewish Folk tradition (1990), 23 min.
Cecilia Franke, Febris (2005), 11 min.
Johan Ramström, KAKEL (2002), 13 min.
Johan Ramström, Vallombrosa (2008), 7 min.
Hans-Erik Dahlgren, Imagines memoriae (2002), 12 min.
Sanna Ahvenjärvi, Fingers to the Bone (2004), 12 min.
Tapio Lappalainen, Violin Duo (2004), 7 min.
Alexander Keuk, Bagatelle (2003), 11 min.
Aron Hidman, Chaconne (2001), 12 min.
Johan Samskog, Al cielo (2001), 13 min.
Jonas Asplund, Forms of the floating fragments (2007), 11 min.
Justin Henry Rubin, Three Chorales (2009), 7 min.
Justin Henry Rubin, Samuel Greenberg Constellation (2009), 10 min.
Fredrik Hagstedt, Depurazione (2002), 29 min.
Fredrik Hagstedt, Sinfonia per due violini (2011), 46 min.
Giorgio Netti, inoltre (2006), 18 min.
Ole Lützow-Holm, Terra 8-band version, 15 min.
Peter Lindroth, Para dos violines (2014–15), 21 min.
Justin Henry Rubin, There were three Ravens (2011), 8 min.
Justin Henry Rubin, Canon (2011), 2 min.
Maria Lithell Flyg, Duolog (2015), 6 min.
Jacqueline Fontyn, Analecta (1981), 9 min.
Carin Bartosch Edström, Asthmose (2006), 15 min.
Samuel Adler, Five Related Miniatures (2014), 11 min.
Britta Byström, Volley (2016), 11 min.
Marie Samuelsson, Two lives (2013), 10 min.
Luigi Nono, Hat que caminar sognando (1989), 17 min.
Bruno Maderna, Serenata per un satellite (1969), 15 min.
Jeremy Wagner, Oberleitung (2013), 7 min.
Michael Duffy, A Lifeless Object, Alive (Dysarthria) (2013), 4 min.
Joshua Musikantow, Autochrome Lumière (2016), 9 min.
Sam Krahn, Resistance/resonance (2013), 7 min.
Adam Zahller, Difficult Ferns (2014), 16 min.
Tiffany M. Skidmore, cistern . anechoic . sonolucent (2016), 10 min.

Awards
Jämtlands Landstingets Kulturpris 2011
Nutida Sound 2011
Jahrespreis der deutschen Schallplattenkritik 2008
Rosenborg-Gehrmans Ensemble Prize 2005
The Society of Swedish Composers’ Interpreter’s Prize (FST) 2003
Västerbotten County Council Great Award 2002
Västerbottens-Kurirens Kulturpris 2000

Bibliography

Duo Gelland
Das große Lexikon der Violine, Laaber 2015: Duo Gelland.
Stefan Drees, Experimentierfreude und Repertoireerkundung. Zur Arbeit des Duo Gelland, in: Die Tonkunst 4, 2008, 466f
Stefan Drees, Until the singing of the spheres brings us together, in: Die Tonkunst 3, 2008, 419f
Stefan Drees, Engagement im Dienste einer vernachlässigten Gattung, in: Dissonanz 93, März 2006, 43f
Anna Rudroff, Ästhetische Erfahrung als Ziel von Musikunterricht – Fragen an ein musikpädagogisches Praxiskonzept aus Schweden, Leipzig 2008
Die Musik in Geschichte und Gegenwart (MGG), Kassel 1994–2008: Duo Gelland
Gunilla Petersén, Hyllad violinduo har fötterna i jämtlänsk jord, Kammarmusik-Nytt, 2009.
Jonas Asplund, ...det rör om i hjärnan på något sätt: En beskrivning av en interpretationsprocess inom samtida konstmusik ur ett kommunikationsperspektiv, Örebro Universitet, Örebro 2007
Ylva Nyberg, Duo Gelland, in: Nutida Musik 47, 2004, H. 1, 38f
Gustaf Jilker, Kulturambassadörer, in: Samefolket 2002, H. 9, 46
Henrik Martén, Duo Gelland – en färgstark ensemble, in: Kammarmusik-Nytt 19, 2002, H. 2, 9
Stefani Ragni, I violini del grande nord, in: Studi e documentazioni 20, 2001, Nr. 41, 37f
Cecilia Gelland, Tystnaden är utrotningshotad, in: Coniunctio 2008
Martin Gelland, Gehörtes re-formulieren – Sprechen über Musik als musikpädagogisches Konzept, Zeitschrift Ästhetische Bildung, Jg. 10 Nr. 1 (2018)
Martin Gelland, ... um etwas davon plötzlich aufleuchten zu lassen, Darstellungsprobleme individuellen Erlebens, Zeitschrift Ästhetische Bildung, Jg. 6 Nr. 2 (2014)
Martin Gelland, Erzwungene Kunst: Schmerz und Freiheitserlebnis, Allan Pettersson und Jean-Paul Sartre im Wechselspiel, in: Musik-Konzepte Heft 162, July 2013
Martin Gelland, Sprunghaftes im gelähmten Stillstand, Allan Pettersson (1911–1980) zum 100. Geburtstag, in: Die Tonkunst 4, 2011

Violin duo and history
 Ulrich Mazurowicz, Das Streichduett in Wien von 1760 bis zum Tode Joseph Haydns, Eichstätter Abhandlungen zur Musikwissenschaft, Band 1, Hans Schneider, Tutzing 1982
 Walter Kolneder, Das Buch der Violine, Antlantis, 1972 and 1993
 Wilhelm Joseph von Wasielewski, Die Violine und ihre Meister, 1868, 4th edition Dresden 1927

External links 
 

Chamber music groups
Contemporary classical music ensembles